Jumada al-Awwal, also known as Jumada al-Ula, or Jumada I, is the fifth month of the Islamic calendar. Jumada al-Awwal spans 29 or 30 days. The origin of the month's name is theorized by some as coming from the word jamād, meaning "arid, dry, or cold", denoting the dry and parched land and hence the dry months of the pre-Islamic Arabian calendar. Jumādā may also be related to a verb meaning "to freeze", and another account relates that water would freeze during this time of year. The secondary name Jumādā al-Ūlā may possibly mean "to take charge with, commend, entrust, commit or care during the arid or cold month". However, this explanation is rejected by some as Jumada al-Awwal is a lunar month that does not coincide with seasons as solar months do.

In the Ottoman Turkish language used in the Ottoman Empire, the name of the month was Jèmāzìyyu-'l-èvvel, or G̃émazi lèlèvvèl. In Turkish, it was abbreviated Jā, or G̃a. In Turkish today the spelling is Cemaziyelevvel.

Timing
The Islamic calendar is a purely lunar calendar, and months begin when the first crescent of a new moon is sighted. Since the Islamic lunar year is 11 to 12 days shorter than the solar year, Jumada al-Awwal migrates backwards throughout the seasons in a cycle of about 33 solar years. The estimated start and end dates for Jumada al-Awwal are as follows (based on the Umm al-Qura calendar of Saudi Arabia):

Islamic events
 On 5 Jumada al-Awwal, Zainab bint Ali was born. 
 On 8th Jumada al-Awwal, URS Sayyid Amir al-Kulal Amir Kulal.
 On 10 Jumada al-Awwal 11 AH, Fatima bint Muhammad (Fatima al-Zahra) beloved daughter of Prophet Muhammad died in Medina at the young age of 23 years according to Sunni Muslim sources. 
 On 13 Jumada al-Awwal 11 AH, Fatima bint Muhammad was buried by her husband Ali.
 On 15 Jumada al-Awwal, Ali ibn Husayn (Zayn al-Abideen) was born.
 On 20 Jumada al-Awwal 857, Ottoman Sultan Mehmed II conquered Constantinople.

See also 
 Jumada al-Thani

References

External links
Islamic-Western Calendar Converter (Based on the Arithmetical or Tabular Calendar)

5
Islamic terminology
kk:Жүмәдүл әууәл
sv:Jumada-l-Awwal
tt:Cömäd-äl-äwäl